Eric McElhone (27 June 1887 – 21 July 1981) was an Australian cricketer. He played seven first-class matches for New South Wales between 1910/11 and 1911/12.

See also
 List of New South Wales representative cricketers

References

External links
 

1887 births
1981 deaths
Australian cricketers
New South Wales cricketers
Cricketers from Sydney